Giacomo Rust or Rusti (1741 in Rome, Italy – 1786 in Barcelona, Spain) was an Italian opera composer, probably of German ancestry.

Not a great deal is known about Rust. Between 1763 and 1777, Rust was active in Venice, where his first opera, a dramma giocoso, La contadina in corte, to a libretto by Niccolò Tassi, was performed in 1763. During this period, Rust acquired great fame as opera composer, not only in Italy, but also abroad, which gained him an invitation to be employed in the service of the Archbishop of Salzburg. On 12 June 1777, he was named a choir master at the Salzburg court, a post that he abandoned towards the end of the year. Some time later, Rust returned to Venice to continue his operatic activity. In 1783, he settled down in Barcelona, where he assumed the office of the Maestro de capilla.

Works 
The following is the list of the operas composed by Rust.

Notes

References 
 Bauman, Thomas and Hintermaier, Ernst (1992), "Rust, Giacomo" in The New Grove Dictionary of Opera, ed. Stanley Sadie (London) 

Italian male classical composers
Italian opera composers
Male opera composers
Italian Classical-period composers
1741 births
1786 deaths
18th-century Italian composers
18th-century Italian male musicians